Dominie (Wiktionary definition) is a Scots language and Scottish English term for a Scottish schoolmaster usually of the Church of Scotland and also a term used in the US for a minister or pastor of the Dutch Reformed Church.

Origin
It comes from the Latin domine (vocative case of Dominus 'Lord, Master').  When the Church of Scotland began to introduce universal provision of education in Scotland after it became established as a national church in 1560, its aim was to have a university-educated schoolmaster in every parish. The minister sometimes served as the dominie. Over time this came to be used as a term for a minister, schoolmaster or university student.

In the United States and in South Africa the same word is used to describe a pastor in the Dutch Reformed Church.

See also
 Dominee

References

Church of Scotland
Education in Scotland
Scots language
Scottish English
Titles
Education and training occupations